Dormont Junction is a station on the Red Line route of Pittsburgh Regional Transit's light rail network. It is located in Dormont, Pennsylvania. The station is an important park and ride facility, featuring 132 spaces. West Liberty Avenue, Dormont's main artery, is located one block uphill from the station, in a portion of the street that is lined with automobile dealerships. Opposite the commercial sector, a densely populated residential area is located with many homes within walking distance of the station.

History

The original Dormont Junction was a wye between the Pittsburgh Railways private right of way 42 Dormont and the street running 38 Mt. Lebanon. The station stopped being a junction in 1963 when the two routes were combined into the 42/38 Mt. Lebanon Beechview, but the name remained. However, it remains one of only a few places along the route with a Railroad switch allowing the trains to switch tracks. The current station was built in 1985 along with the  Mt. Lebanon Tunnel, which bypassed 8 blocks of street running along Washington Road.

Connecting buses
41 Bower Hill: West Liberty Avenue at Park Boulevard

References

External links

Station from Raleigh Avenue from Google Maps Street View

Port Authority of Allegheny County stations
Railway stations in the United States opened in 1985
Red Line (Pittsburgh)